Wilhelm Weigand (13 March 1862, in Gissigheim, Baden-Württemberg – 20 December 1949, in Munich) was a German Neoromanticism and Realism period poet and writer. He was born Wilhelm Schnarrenberger, but on 2 May 1888 he took the maiden name of his grandmother.

Distinctions
 Johann-Peter-Hebel Prize (1942)
 Honorary Citizen of the Community of Gissigheim

Selected works
 Der Frankenthaler, novel (Leipzig, 1889)
 Sommer, poems (1894)
 Der zwiefache Eros, short stories (1896)
 Die Löffelstelze, novel (Tübingen, 1919)
 Der Hof Ludwigs XIV. Nach den Denkwürdigkeiten des Herzogs von Saint-Simon, history (c. 1922)
 Der graue Bote, short stories (Prague 1924)
 Die Fahrt zur Liebesinsel, novel (1928)
 Die Gärten Gottes, novel (1930)
 Helmhausen, novel (1938)
 Welt und Weg. Aus meinem Leben, autobiography (1940)
 Die rote Flut. Der Münchener Revolutions- und Rätespuk 1918/19, novel (Munich 1935)
 Der Ring.: Schicksale um ein Familienkleinod. (Tübingen 1947)
 Sebastian Scherzlgeigers Fahrt nach Kautzien – Auch ein Reiferoman, novel (1948)

References 
 This article is translated from that in the German Wikipedia

1862 births
1949 deaths
19th-century German poets
People from the Grand Duchy of Baden
German male poets
19th-century German male writers